Tirkkonen is a Finnish surname. Notable people with the surname include:

Paavo Tirkkonen (1947–2012), Finnish ice hockey player
Paul Tirkkonen (1884–1968), Finnish wrestler
Pekka Tirkkonen (born 1968), Finnish ice hockey player and coach
Theodor Tirkkonen (1883–1951), Finnish wrestler

Finnish-language surnames